SkilledTradesBC is a provincial government agency in the province of British Columbia, Canada.

It was established in 2004 as Industry Training Authority (ITA) to replace the Industry, Training and Apprenticeship Commission (ITAC) after the Government of BC abolished mandatory certification for skilled trades in 2003. Its mandate is to facilitate training in the trades and industry occupations in the province.

In 2021, the Government of BC announced the reintroduction of mandatory skilled trades certification and the ITA was renamed to SkilledTradesBC in December 2022.

References

External links
 SkilledTradesBC - Official Site

Crown corporations of British Columbia
Vocational education in Canada